The 2012 FIBA EuroChallenge Final Four was the concluding tournament of the 2012–13 FIBA EuroChallenge season. The Final Four was held in the Főnix Hall at Debrecen, Hungary.

Bracket

Semifinals

Third place game

Final

References

FIBA EuroChallenge Final Fours
International basketball competitions hosted by Hungary